The 1989 All-Ireland Senior Football Championship final was a Gaelic football match played at Croke Park on 17 September 1989 to determine the winners of the 1989 All-Ireland Senior Football Championship, the 103rd season of the All-Ireland Senior Football Championship, a tournament organised by the Gaelic Athletic Association for the champions of the four provinces of Ireland. The final was contested by Mayo of Connacht and Cork of Munster, with Cork winning by 0-17 to 1-11.

In what is regarded as one of the best and most entertaining finals of its era, the Cork and Mayo All-Ireland decider provided "great fun at a time when football badly needed some".< Cork entered the game hoping to avoid the unwanted accolade of becoming the first team in almost fifty years to lose three successive All-Ireland finals. Inspired by this they got off to a great start with three quick points before Mayo settled into the match. At half time Cork led by 0-10 to 0-8.

Mayo were rejuvenated after the interval. An Anthony Finnerty goal in the 38th minute gave Mayo a brief lead. Finnerty’s goal looked as though it might swing the tide in Mayo’s favour. Cork hit back to equalize through Dave Barry and a brace of scores from John Cleary handed the Rebels the initiative. Mayo's Noel Durkan set Finnerty free again minutes later, however, in a key turning point of the game, he planted his shot into the side-netting. Mayo failed to score for the last sixteen minutes as Mick McCarthy and Teddy McCarthy kicked over the final points of the game.

Cork's All-Ireland victory was their first since 1973. The win gave them their fifth All-Ireland title over all and put them joint fourth on the all-time roll of honour along with Meath, Cavan and Wexford.

The team Mayo selected for the 1989 All-Ireland SFC final was full of players more accustomed to the role of midfielder than anything else, e.g. T. J. Kilgallon at centre-back and Greg Maher at wing-forward.

Mayo were appearing in their first All-Ireland final since they triumphed in 1951. Defeat at the hands of Cork was the first of ten All-Ireland defeats without victory between 1989 and 2020.

Match

Details

References

All-Ireland Senior Football Championship Final
All-Ireland Senior Football Championship Final, 1989
All-Ireland Senior Football Championship Finals
All-Ireland Senior Football Championship Finals
Cork county football team matches
Mayo county football team matches